Zain Al Rafeea (born 10 October 2004) is a Syrian-born Norwegian actor. He is best known for his starring role in the 2018 Lebanese film Capernaum, which won the Jury Prize at the 2018 Cannes Film Festival.

Life and career
Al Rafeea was born in Daraa, Syria in 2004 before his family moved to Lebanon in 2012. A Syrian refugee, he grew up in the slums of Beirut with his parents. He was 12 and illiterate during the production of Capernaum. He was not trained as an actor. Al Rafeea's Capernaum character, Zain, is named for him.

In November 2018, director Nadine Labaki reported Al Rafeea's situation had changed:  Al Rafeea began attending school in Hammerfest.

For Capernaum, Al Rafeea was nominated for the Asia Pacific Screen Award for Best Performance by an Actor. He also won Best Actor at the 2018 International Antalya Film Festival. The New York Times named his as one of the best performances of 2018, with reporter Wesley Morris writing, "Every once in a while, you leave a movie having seen a performance that mocks all the other acting that came before it". James Verniere of the Boston Herald described Al Rafeea as "part Oliver Twist, part James Dean".

In 2021, he appeared as a villager in the Marvel Cinematic Universe (MCU) film Eternals.

Filmography

Awards and nominations

References

External links 
 

2004 births
21st-century Syrian male actors
Asian child actors
Living people
Male child actors
Norwegian actors
Refugees of the Syrian civil war
Syrians in Lebanon
Syrian emigrants to Norway